The 1977–78 Scottish Cup was the 93rd staging of Scotland's most prestigious football knockout competition. The Cup was won by Rangers who defeated Aberdeen in the final.

First round

Replays

Second round

Replays

Third round

Replays

Fourth round

Replays

Quarter-finals

Replays

Semi-finals

Final

See also

1977–78 in Scottish football
1977–78 Scottish League Cup

Scottish Cup seasons
1977–78 in Scottish football
Scot